The 2004 Czech Republic motorcycle Grand Prix was the tenth round of the 2004 MotoGP Championship. It took place on the weekend of 20–22 August 2004 at the Masaryk Circuit located in Brno, Czech Republic.

MotoGP classification

250 cc classification

125 cc classification

Championship standings after the race (motoGP)

Below are the standings for the top five riders and constructors after round ten has concluded.

Riders' Championship standings

Constructors' Championship standings

 Note: Only the top five positions are included for both sets of standings.

References

Czech Republic motorcycle Grand Prix
Czech Republic
Motorcycle Grand Prix